The 2009 Ukrainian Figure Skating Championships took place between 16 and 19 December 2008 in Kyiv. Skaters competed in the disciplines of men's singles, ladies' singles, pair skating, and ice dancing on the senior level. The results of the national championships were used to choose the teams to the 2009 World Championships and the 2009 European Championships.

Results

Men

Ladies

Pairs

Ice dancing

External links
 results

Ukrainian Figure Skating Championships
Ukrainian Figure Skating Championships, 2009
2008 in figure skating
2008 in Ukrainian sport
2009 in Ukrainian sport